Saris Rouvy Sauerland Team is a UCI Continental team founded in 2016 and based in North Rhine-Westphalia, Germany. It participates in UCI Continental Circuits races.

Team roster

References

External links

UCI Continental Teams (Europe)
Cycling teams based in Germany
Cycling teams established in 2016